West Buckland is a small village and former manor located  east-south-east of Barnstaple in North Devon, England. South Molton is the nearest town. The hamlet of Elwell lies to its north-east.

The civil parishes of East Buckland and West Buckland were merged on 1 April 1986, forming the civil parish of East and West Buckland.

History
The manor was formerly part of the Fortescue Estate, owned by the Earls Fortescue of nearby Castle Hill, Filleigh. Earlier the manor together with the advowson of the church had been acquired by the influential Barnstaple merchant and MP John Delbridge (1564-1639).

Access
Most travellers reach West Buckland by a steep, winding, mostly single track hill up from the North Devon Link Road (A361).

Facilities
Until 2008 the village had a small post office; the post office is now held in the church on two afternoons a week, Tuesdays and Thursdays. West Buckland was one of the first villages in the country to arrange such a facility. The village has a refurbished village hall. There is no public house, but the village hall now has a licensed bar which is opened during a considerable number of social events throughout the year.

West Buckland School

The village may be best known for having given its name to the adjacent co-educational independent West Buckland School: educators of, amongst others, England cricketer Harold Gimblett and British world record triple-jumper Jonathan Edwards. Despite taking the name, the school comprising its preparatory school, three boarding houses and the public school itself is  located on an extensive campus about 1 km east of the village and instead it is the small parish church which draws most visitors from the local area. The daily school traffic includes a fleet of long coaches which pass through the narrow village street twice a day.

West Buckland Festival
Previously, there was a thriving, annual four-day "Festival of Music, Art and Entertainment", which included both international and local performers, a very successful Art and Craft Exhibition and various workshops.

We regret to say that we no longer hold a Festival in the village.

References

External links
 West Buckland Festival

GENUKI page

Villages in Devon
Former manors in Devon